Mario Bossi may refer to:

 Mario Bossi (footballer, born 1909), Italian footballer who played for Roma and Sampiedarenese in the Serie A
 A character from the Japanese manga and anime Gunslinger Girl